Radfordia is a genus of mites belonging to the family Myobiidae.

The genus has cosmopolitan distribution.

Species:

Radfordia affinis 
Radfordia arvicolae 
Radfordia eliomys 
Radfordia ensifera 
Radfordia hata 
Radfordia japonica 
Radfordia lancearia 
Radfordia lemnina 
Radfordia mikado 
Radfordia mirabilis
Radfordia palustris 
Radfordia zibethicalis

References

Acari